Ruel Hamilton is an American author, businessman and political activist. He is the founder and CEO of AmeriSouth Realty, a company in affordable apartment development. In 2014, Hamilton was considered one of Texas' biggest supporters of Democrats and liberal organizations.

Hamilton is a graduate of Justin F. Kimball High School in Dallas, Texas. He founded Amerisouth Realty as Olympic Realty in 1987. The first iteration of the company managed Class C multifamily apartment complexes until the 1990s when it began purchasing properties itself. The company was renamed AmeriSouth Realty Group in 2000.

References 

Living people
American writers
American businesspeople
Year of birth missing (living people)